The Smithers Formation is a geologic formation in British Columbia. It preserves fossils dating back to the Jurassic period.

See also

 List of fossiliferous stratigraphic units in British Columbia

References
 

Geologic formations of Canada
Jurassic British Columbia
Toarcian Stage